North Hempstead is one of three towns in Nassau County, on Long Island, in New York, United States. The population was 237,639 at the 2020 census.

History
The area was first settled by Europeans around 1643 and became part of the town of Hempstead. During the American Revolution the southern part of Hempstead was primarily Tory, while the northern part, having been settled by Yankees, supported the revolution. Following the war, the Town of North Hempstead was split off in 1784.

North Hempstead became more affluent with the opening of the Long Island Rail Road through to Great Neck, and the inauguration of steamboat service from Manhattan in 1836.

The Town of North Hempstead is made up of 30 incorporated villages that claimed the right to set zoning restrictions to protect their rights and resources. No new villages have been created in the Town of North Hempstead since 1932, and prospective villages were further discouraged from incorporating when the county charter was revised in 1936, which denied zoning powers to future villages.

There are also some unincorporated areas in the Town of North Hempstead which are not part of villages; these areas are instead governed by the Town of North Hempstead.

Geography

The western town line is the border of Queens County, New York, part of New York City.  The northern town line, delineated by the Long Island Sound, is the border of Bronx County and Westchester County. The town of Oyster Bay is its eastern neighbor.

North Hempstead is the only town on Long Island that does not have a corresponding hamlet or village in its borders with the same name; Hempstead and Oyster Bay in Nassau County and the towns of Huntington, Babylon, Islip, Smithtown, Brookhaven, Riverhead, Southold, Southampton, Shelter Island and East Hampton in Suffolk County all have smaller neighborhoods with the same name.

Demographics

As of the census of 2000, there were 222,611 people, 76,820 households, and 58,460 families residing in the town.  The population density was 4,154.9 people per square mile (1,604.2/km2).  There were 78,927 housing units at an average density of 1,473.1 per square mile (568.8/km2).  The racial makeup of the town was 78.98% White, 6.40% African American, 0.14% Native American, 9.11% Asian, 0.03% Pacific Islander, 2.90% from other races, and 2.45% from two or more races. Hispanic or Latino of any race were 9.83% of the population.

There were 76,820 households, out of which 33.6% had children under the age of 18 living with them, 64.0% were married couples living together, 8.9% had a female householder with no husband present, and 23.9% were non-families. 20.6% of all households were made up of individuals, and 10.3% had someone living alone who was 65 years of age or older.  The average household size was 2.84 and the average family size was 3.27.

In the town, the population was spread out, with 23.6% under the age of 18, 7.5% from 18 to 24, 27.1% from 25 to 44, 25.2% from 45 to 64, and 16.6% who were 65 years of age or older.  The median age was 40 years. For every 100 females, there were 92.8 males.  For every 100 females age 18 and over, there were 89.5 males.

According to a 2007 estimate, the median income for a household in the town was $96,517, and the median income for a family was $115,697. Males had a median income of $60,094 versus $41,331 for females. The per capita income for the town was $41,621. About 3.1% of families and 4.8% of the population were below the poverty line, including 5.4% of those under age 18 and 5.1% of those age 65 or over.

Between the 1990 census and the 2000 census, North Hempstead lost some population growth to Queens.

Communities in North Hempstead

Villages (incorporated) 
The Town of North Hempstead contains 31 villages:
Baxter Estates
East Hills (part; with the Town of Oyster Bay)
East Williston
Floral Park (part; with the Town of Hempstead)
Flower Hill
Garden City (part; with Hempstead)
Great Neck
Great Neck Estates
Great Neck Plaza
Kensington
Kings Point
Lake Success
Manorhaven
Mineola (part; with Hempstead.)
Munsey Park
New Hyde Park (part; with Hempstead.)
North Hills
Old Westbury (part; with Oyster Bay.)
Plandome
Plandome Heights
Plandome Manor
Port Washington North
Roslyn
Roslyn Estates
Roslyn Harbor (part; with Oyster Bay.)
Russell Gardens
Saddle Rock
Sands Point
Thomaston
Westbury
Williston Park

Hamlets (unincorporated)
The Town of North Hempstead includes the following unincorporated hamlets, which are governed by North Hempstead:

Albertson
Carle Place
Garden City Park
Glenwood Landing (part; with Oyster Bay.)
Great Neck Gardens
Greenvale (part; with Oyster Bay.)
Harbor Hills
Herricks
Hillside Manor
Manhasset (town seat)
Manhasset Hills
New Cassel
North New Hyde Park
Port Washington
Roslyn Heights
Saddle Rock Estates
Searingtown
Strathmore
University Gardens

Other locations
Cow Neck, or Manhasset Neck — A peninsula into the Long Island Sound.
Great Neck — A peninsula into the Long Island Sound.
Hempstead Harbor — A bay of the Long Island Sound.
Lake Success — A lake near the western town line.
Little Neck Bay — A bay of the Long Island Sound.
Manhasset Bay — A bay of the Long Island Sound.
United States Merchant Marine Academy, located in Kings Point.

Government
The Town of North Hempstead is governed by a seven-member board composed of six council members and the Town Supervisor. Council members are each elected by and represent a single district within the Town.  The Supervisor is elected by and represents the entirety of the Town. In addition to Supervisor, there are two other Town-wide elected positions—Town Clerk and Receiver of Taxes.

Elected officials

Supervisor 
As of August 2022, the Town Supervisor of North Hempstead is Jennifer S. DeSena (R (D)-Manhasset). DeSena, a registered Democrat who ran on the Republican ticket, succeeded Judi Bosworth. DeSena defeated former Town Clerk and Nassau County Legislator Wayne H. Wink, Jr. (D-Roslyn).

Council members 
As of August 2022, the North Hempstead Town Council consists of the following council members:

Clerk 
As of August 2022, the Town Clerk of North Hempstead is Ragini Srivastava (R-Manhasset Hills).

Receiver of Taxes 
As of August 2022, the Receiver of Taxes of North Hempstead is Charles Berman (D-Roslyn Heights).

Politics 
In the 2020 U.S. presidential election, the majority of voters residing within the Town of North Hempstead and cast a vote in the election voted for Joseph Biden (D).

Economy

 Northwell Health, the largest employer on Long Island, is based in Great Neck.
 The Americana Manhasset (and the "Miracle Mile", as a whole) - one of Long island's most famous shopping malls and areas - is located on Northern Boulevard (NY 25A) in Manhasset.
 The North American headquarters of Sabena were located in a  office building in Manhasset in North Hempstead. In April 2002 Knightsbridge Properties Corp. bought the building for $4.9 million. Due to the bankruptcies of Sabena and Swissair, the real estate deal took over a year to finish. During that month, the building was 30% occupied. Sabena was scheduled to move out of the building on May 10, 2002. The buyer planned to spend an additional $2 million to convert the building into a multi-tenant, Class A office and medical facility. At one time, Servisair's Americas offices were in Great Neck.
 Sumitomo Corporation operates its Lake Success Shared Services Center in an area in the town of North Hempstead, south of Lake Success.
 Systemax, Pall, Publishers Clearing House and NPD Group are based in Port Washington.

Top employers

According to North Hempstead's 2011 Comprehensive Annual Financial Report, the top employers in the town are:

Transportation

Rail service

The Long Island Rail Road's Oyster Bay Branch serves the town's vicinity from Mineola to Greenvale. The Main Line runs through the southern parts of the town from with stations at Merillon Avenue in Garden City Park through Westbury. The Port Washington Branch runs along the northern part of the town and uses stations from Great Neck across the Manhasset Viaduct into Port Washington.

Bus service
The Town of North Hempstead is served primarily by Nassau Inter-County Express bus routes, though at least two MTA Bus Routes enter Nassau County from Queens.

Major roads

 Interstate 495 is the Long Island Expressway, and the sole interstate highway in the Town of North Hempstead, with interchanges from Exit 33 in Lake Success to Exits 39 in Old Westbury.
 Northern State Parkway is a suburban continuation of the Grand Central Parkway that has interchanges from Exit 25 in Lake Success to Exit 34 in Westbury. The route runs along the south side of the Long Island Expressway. As a parkway, no trucks are allowed.
 Meadowbrook State Parkway runs south to north and only exists within the town between Old Country Road (Exits M1) and Northern State Parkway.
 Wantagh State Parkway only exists within the town between Old Country Rd (Exit W2) and Northern State Parkway.
 New York State Route 25A is the northernmost west-east route in the town, and is a suffixed route of NY 25.
 New York State Route 25B is another west-east suffixed route of NY 25 that runs from the Bellerose section of Queens into NY 25 in Westbury.
 New York State Route 25
 New York State Route 101 is a south-north state route that runs from Flower Hill, through downtown Port Washington, and eventually into Sands Point.
Beacon Hill Road
Glen Cove Road
Herricks Road
Old Country Road
Shelter Rock Road
West Shore Road

Airports
Sands Point Seaplane Base

See also 

List of towns in New York
National Register of Historic Places listings in North Hempstead (town), New York

References

External links

 Town of North Hempstead official website

Towns in Nassau County, New York
 
Towns on Long Island
Towns in the New York metropolitan area
Populated coastal places in New York (state)